Auguste Cavignac (born 20 May 1928) is a Belgian boxer. He competed in the men's middleweight event at the 1948 Summer Olympics.

References

External links

1928 births
Possibly living people
Middleweight boxers
Belgian male boxers
Olympic boxers of Belgium
Boxers at the 1948 Summer Olympics
People from Marchiennes
Sportspeople from Nord (French department)